The Women's 12.5 kilometre biathlon mass start competition at the 2006 Winter Olympics in Turin, Italy was held on 25 February, at Cesana San Sicario. Competitors raced over five loops of a 2.5 kilometre skiing course, shooting twenty times, ten prone and ten standing. Each miss required a competitor to ski a 150-metre penalty loop.

Germany's Martina Glagow led the World Cup standings before the Olympics, while Norway's Gro Marit Istad Kristiansen was the reigning World Champion at the event.

Results 

The race was held at 12:00.

References

Women's biathlon at the 2006 Winter Olympics